Qutuyıv Ğädelşa Nurmöxämmät ulı (pronounced ; Tatar Cyrillic: Кутуев Гаделша Нурмөхәммәт улы; , Kutuy Adel Nurmukhammetovich), better known as Ğädel Qutuy (Janalif: Ƣədel Qutuj; Tatar Cyrillic: Гадел Кутуй; ; frequently anglicized as Adel Kutuy; 28 November 1903 Tatarskie Kynady, Kuznetsky Uyezd, Saratov Governorate Russian Empire – 15 June 1945 Zgierz, Poland) was a Soviet Tatar poet, writer and playwright.

Life 
Qutuy moved to Kazan in 1922, and 5 year later gained recognition as one of five the most prominent Tatar writer. Impressed by Mayakovsky, he established Tatar analogue of LEF, SULF, i.e. Sul Front – Left Front. In 1930, after Cidegän affair was concocted, he was imprisoned. However, he managed to prove guiltiness and was released after 8 month of trial. After this, he wrote his most prominent novels. In 1941 he volunteered to the Red Army to fight against Nazis in World War II. In 1944 he became a war correspondent. In March 1945 he caught a cold and eventually died in hospital.

Legacy 
His early verses, such as published in Könnär yögergändä (When the Days Fly, 1924) contributed to futurism. A poem Talantlar watanı (The Birthplace of the Talents, 1937), novels Soltannıñ ber köne (One day of the Life of Soltan, 1938), Wocdan ğazabı (The Torments of Conscience, 1939) are about role of intelligentsia in society. The most prominent writing of Qutuy is a lyrical novel Tapşırılmağan xatlar (Letters, which were not sent, 1936). He also wrote a science-fiction Röstäm macaraları (The Adventures of Röstäm, 1945). Qutuy wrote several plays: Baldızqay (Sister-in-law, 1926), Qazan (The Cauldron, 1927), Cawap, (Answer, 1929). The complete publishing of his writings issued after his death include Publitsistika (1957) and İlham (1982).

His son, Rustem Qutuy, is a Russian-language writer and resides in Kazan.

In Kazan there is a street Ğädel Qutuy.

1903 births
1945 deaths
Tatar poets
Soviet poets
Male poets
Soviet male writers
20th-century Russian male writers
Russian war correspondents
Soviet journalists
Russian male journalists
Tatar dramatists and playwrights
Tatar people of Russia
20th-century dramatists and playwrights
20th-century Russian journalists
Soviet military personnel of World War II
Soviet war correspondents
War correspondents of World War II